In geometry, the elongated pentagonal gyrocupolarotunda is one of the Johnson solids. As the name suggests, it can be constructed by elongating a pentagonal gyrocupolarotunda by inserting a decagonal prism between its halves. Rotating either the pentagonal cupola or the pentagonal rotunda through 36 degrees before inserting the prism yields an elongated pentagonal orthocupolarotunda .

Formulae
The following formulae for volume and surface area can be used if all faces are regular, with edge length a:

References

External links
 

Johnson solids